The Sela Pass (more appropriately called Se La, as La means Pass) is a high-altitude mountain pass located on the border between the Tawang and West Kameng districts in the Indian state of Arunachal Pradesh. It has an elevation of 4170 m (13,700 ft) and connects the Indian Buddhist town of Tawang to Dirang and Guwahati.  The pass carries the National Highway 13 (previously NH 229), connecting Tawang with the rest of India. The pass supports scarce amounts of vegetation and is usually snow-covered to some extent throughout the year. Sela Lake, near the summit of the pass, is one of approximately 101 lakes in the area that are sacred in Tibetan Buddhism. While Sela Pass does get heavy snowfall in winters, it is usually open throughout the year unless landslides or snow require the pass to be shut down temporarily.

Geography
Sela Pass crosses a subrange of the Himalayas that separates Tawang District from the rest of India. The pass is 4170 m (13,700 ft) high and is situated at a distance of 78 km from Tawang town and 340 km from Guwahati. While the Border Roads Organization (BRO) of India works to keep the pass open throughout the year, it may shut down temporarily after landslides and during heavy snow. Summers at Sela Pass are not very cold, but temperature in winter can dip down to -10 degree Celsius. This lake often freezes during the winter and is drained in Nuranang River, a tributary of the Tawang River. Limited vegetation grows around the lake, which is used as a grazing site for yaks during the summer.

Tunnel
Sela Tunnel, Government of India announced the funding for construction of all weather road transport tunnel in 2018-19 budget. Construction started in January 2019. The plan includes two tunnels (980 metres and 1,555 metres long) and a link road (1,200 metres long). The Indian railway have undertaken the final location survey of Strategically important railway project to bring Tawang on railway map through Bhalukpong-Tawang railway, project survey work expected to be completed by December 2022, will also pass through here.

Religion
Sela Pass is a sacred site in Tibetan Buddhism. Buddhists believe that there are about 101 sacred lakes in and around the pass.

Sino-Indian War
During the Sino-Indian War in 1962, the Sela Pass was one of the locations that saw significant action. The Chinese PLA infiltrated into the south of the ridge through other routes and the Indian position was withdrawn. 
A sepoy of the Indian Army named Jaswant Singh Rawat remained at the pass fighting rearguard action, and is said to have held off the Chinese for 72 hours. He was awarded the Maha Vir Chakra  posthumously for his courage and devotion to duty.

Gallery

See also
 Tourism in North East India
 Tawang Town
 Tawang Monastery
 Bhalukpong-Tawang railway, under-construction
 2022 Yangtse clash

References

Mountain passes of Arunachal Pradesh